Troitskoye is a rural locality (a village) in Krasnokurtovsky Selsoviet, Arkhangelsky District, Bashkortostan, Russia. The population was 63 as of 2010. There is 1 street.

Geography 
Troitskoye is located 35 km north of Arkhangelskoye (the district's administrative centre) by road. Uspenka is the nearest rural locality.

References 

Rural localities in Arkhangelsky District